Valmiki Nayak (5 June 1951 – 17 July 2021) was an Indian politician and a former member of Karnataka Legislative Assembly from Chittapur constituency.

Personal life 
Valmiki Nayak worked at ACC Limited, an Indian cement manufacturer before entering politics. He studied up to Pre University Course. Valmiki Nayak was married to Sona Bai and they have two sons and four daughters together.

Political life 
He began his political career by contesting the Mandal panchayat elections at Wadi in 1986-87. He contested 1999 Karnataka Legislative Assembly elections from Shahabad against Baburao Chavhan and lost by a margin of 7866 votes. Later he was defeated by Mallikarjun Kharge from Chittapur in 2008 Karnataka Legislative Assembly elections. Valmiki Nayak was victorious against Priyank M. Kharge (son of Mallikarjun Kharge) in 2009 by-election from Chittapur which was a seat vacated by Mallikarjun Kharge after he was elected to 15th Lok Sabha as a Member of Parliament representing Gulbarga Lok Sabha constituency. However he lost to Priyank M. Kharge in 2013 and 2018.

Death 

He developed sudden chest pain during morning walk and was rushed to Jayadeva Institute of Cardiovascular Sciences and Research in Gulbarga, where he was declared dead due to cardiac arrest. He was survived by wife, two sons and four daughters. His body was later shifted to his native place i.e., Wadi where it was to be kept for public viewing.

References

External links 

 Karnataka Legislative Assembly

1951 births
2021 deaths
Bharatiya Janata Party politicians from Karnataka
Karnataka MLAs 2018–2023
People from Kalaburagi district